Minuscule 541 (in the Gregory-Aland numbering), 554 (in the Scrivener's numbering), ε 400 (in Soden's numbering), is a Greek minuscule manuscript of the New Testament, on a parchment. Palaeographically it has been assigned to the 15th century.

The manuscript was adapted for liturgical use. It is incomplete.

Description 

The codex contains some parts of the Gospel of Matthew and Gospel of Mark, on 49 parchment leaves (size ), with numerous lacunae. The text is written in one column per page, 21 lines per page. It is neatly written, but has survived in bad condition. The iota adscript does not occur.

 Contents
 Matthew 18:32-24:10; 26:8-28:20; Mark 1:16-13:9; 14:9-26.

There is also a division according to the smaller Ammonian Sections, with references to the Eusebian Canons (only partially). The Ammonian Sections are red in Matthew, in Mark are often black. The references to the Eusebian Canons are mostly omitted.

There are many abridgements in the writing. The rubrical directions in margin are both in black and red. Some corrections seem to be written by prima manu others plainly secondary manu (Matthew 20,13.20; 21,42; 27,64; Mark 1:22; 5:19; 6:15; 10:32; 11:3).

 Errors
According tο Scrivener,  occurs only seven times, a hiatus for the lack of it thrice."

There are many omissions by homoioteleuton (Matthew 21:32; 22:2.3; 23:3.12; Mark 2:22; 4:24; 7:20; 8:11.37; 9:5; 10:19.32; 11:15.28).

Text 

The Greek text of the codex is a representative of the Byzantine text-type. Aland placed it in Category V.

It has some corrections – by erasure – made both by the first hand and later.

History 

The manuscript is dated, probably by the first hand, to the year 1323, but dated by paleographers to the 15th century.

In 1864 the manuscript was purchased from a dealer at Janina in Epeiros, by Baroness Burdett-Coutts (1814–1906), a philanthropist, together with other Greek manuscripts (among them codices 532-546). They were transported to England in 1870-1871.

The manuscript was presented by Burdett-Coutts to Sir Roger Cholmely's School, and was housed at the Highgate (Burdett-Coutts II. 26. 2), in London. It was examined and collated by Scrivener in his Adversaria critica sacra (1893).

It was added to the list of the New Testament manuscripts by F. H. A. Scrivener and C. R. Gregory. Gregory saw it in 1883.

In 1922 it was acquired for the University of Michigan.

It is currently housed at the University of Michigan (Ms. Inv. No. 23b) in Ann Arbor.

Images

See also 

 List of New Testament minuscules
 Biblical manuscript
 Textual criticism

Notes

References

Further reading 

 Frederick Henry Ambrose Scrivener, Adversaria Critica Sacra: With a Short Explanatory Introduction (Cambridge, 1893), pp. XLVII-XLIX. (as n)
 Kenneth W. Clark, A Descriptive Catalogue of Greek New Testament Manuscripts in America (Chicago, 1937), pp. 294–295.

External links 

 Images of the minuscule 541 at the CSNTM

Greek New Testament minuscules
15th-century biblical manuscripts
University of Michigan